= Reserve player =

Reserve player may refer to:

- A player available to substitute for a player in the starting lineup
- A player on the reserve team and not on the main roster
- A player on the injured reserve list
